Thomas Hart Clay (1803–1871) was the U.S. ambassador to Honduras and Nicaragua, and the son of Henry Clay.

References

External links
 

1803 births
1871 deaths
Henry Clay family
People from Lexington, Kentucky
American people of English descent
Ambassadors of the United States to Honduras
Ambassadors of the United States to Nicaragua